Pollicaria, commonly known as the elephant pupinid snails, is a genus of land snails with a gill and an operculum. They are in the family Pupinidae, superfamily Cyclophoroidea.

This genus of land snails is endemic to Indochina.

Like other pupinid snails, the shells of these snails are shaped like insect pupae. The soft parts of species in this genus are yellowish to pale orange in color, and their shells can range in color from black or yellowish to bright orange. These snails feed on decaying organic matter on forest floors.

Taxonomy
Pollicaria belongs to the family Pupinidae of the superfamily Cyclophoroidea. The genus was first established by the American malacologist Augustus Addison Gould in 1856, to contain his newly described Cyclostoma pollex (now accepted as Pollicaria gravida).

Species
The genus Pollicaria contains six species:
 Pollicaria arlingi Thach, 2018
Pollicaria elephas (Morgan, 1885) - endemic to limestone outcrops in Perak, Peninsular Malaysia
Pollicaria gravida (Benson, 1856) - endemic to Burma, including Mawlamyine, Dawei and Tanintharyi
Pollicaria mouhoti (Pfeifer, 1862)
Pollicaria mouhoti mouhoti (Pfeifer, 1862) - found in Cambodia, and some areas of Thailand
Pollicaria mouhoti monochroma Kongim & Panha, 2013 - found in Thailand
Pollicaria myersii (Haines, 1855) - synonym: Pollicaria rochebruni (Mabille, 1887) (endemic to Tonkin, Vietnam) - restricted to limestone areas in Vientiane to Luang Prabang in Laos. Probably also found in northern Thailand
 Pollicaria nicoarlingi Thach, 2021
 Pollicaria rochebruni (Mabille, 1887)
Synonyms
Pollicaria crossei (Dautzenberg & ďHamonville, 1887) - endemic to Tonkin, Vietnam: synonym of Pollicaria rochebruni (Mabille, 1887)
 Pollicaria myersi (Haines, 1855): synonym of Pollicaria myersii (Haines, 1855) (incorrect subsequent spelling)

Description
Elephant pupinid snails have distinctively shaped shells that resemble insect pupae. The shells possess a shallow angled groove at the rear which functions as a breathing device. They range in color from monochrome black or yellowish to bright orange 

The body is yellowish to pale orange. Patches of dark-brown to black spots may be found scattered on the head and on the upper surfaces of the muscular foot. The head contains darker orange tentacles with dark eye spots on the outer base. The foot is broad and short. The operculum is attached to the rear top part of the foot.

Elephant pupinid snails are dioecious (having separate male and female sexes). Males have a cone-shaped external penis on the right side of their body which will broaden and enlarge during mating season. Females also have a genital groove on the right side of their body.

Distribution and habitat
Elephant pupinid snails are endemic to tropical forests in Indochina. They are present in Burma, Cambodia, Laos, Peninsular Malaysia, Thailand, and Vietnam. They are commonly found in abundant numbers under the leaf litter of forests near limestone outcroppings.

Ecology
Like other pupinids, elephant pupinid snails are important decomposers, feeding on decaying organic matter under leaf litter on the forest floor.

References

External links 
 Benson, W. H. (1859). Observation of shell and animal of Hybocystis, a new genus of Cyclostomidae, based on Megalostoma gravidum and Otopoma blennus, B.; with notes on other living shells from India and Burmah. Annals and Magazine of Natural History. (3) 4: 90–93
 Kobelt W. (1902). Das Tierreich. Eine Zusammenstellung und Kennzeichnung der rezenten Tierformen. 16. Lieferung. Mollusca. Cyclophoridae. Das Tierreich. XXXIX + 662 pp., 1 map.

Pollicaria